Raymond Watson (died 2012) was chairman of Walt Disney Productions..

Raymond Watson may also refer to:

 Raymond Watson (artist) (born 1958), visual artist from Belfast, Northern Ireland
 J. Raymond Watson, Puerto Rican engineer
 Ray Watson (athlete) (1898–1974), American track and field athlete
 Ray Watson (broadcaster) (born 1936), California politician
 Ray Watson (judge) (1922–2010), Australian Family Court judge
 Ray H. Watson (1923–2004), American football coach